Brad Nortman (born September 12, 1989) is a former American football punter. He played college football at the University of Wisconsin. He was drafted by the Carolina Panthers in the sixth round of the 2012 NFL Draft, making him the first punter that the team had drafted in its history.

High school career
Nortman was born and raised in Brookfield, Wisconsin. Nortman attended Brookfield Central High School in Brookfield, Wisconsin. Nortman was ranked as the No. 4 punter in the nation by Rivals.com and No. 8 by Scout.com. He was rated as the fourth-best player in the state of Wisconsin by Scout.com for the 2008 recruiting class. Following his senior season, Nortman was named first-team all-state as a punter, first-team all Greater Metro Conference as a linebacker as well as Greater Metro Conference co-defensive back of the year. He also played tight end garnering honorable mention  Greater Metro Conference honors during his senior year.

College career
Nortman attended the University of Wisconsin from 2008–2011. In the 2008 season, he finished with 66 punts for 2,781 net yards for a 41.8 average. In the 2009 season, he finished with 49 punts for 2,056 net yards for a 42.0 average. After his sophomore season in 2009, Nortman was named honorable mention All-Big Ten (coaches), ESPN the Magazine Academic All-District and Academic All-Big Ten. In the 2010 season, he finished with 38 punts for 1,623 net yards for a 42.7 average. Following his junior season in 2010, Nortman was named academic All-Big Ten. In the 2011 season, he finished with 46 punts for 1,943 net yards for a 42.2 average. Following the 2011 season, Nortman was named consensus honorable mention All-Big Ten, Academic All-Big Ten and participated in the 2012 Senior Bowl. Nortman ranks third in Wisconsin history with a career punting average of 42.1 yards per punt. He is fourth in school history with 8,383 career punting yards and fifth with 199 career punts.

Professional career

Carolina Panthers
Nortman was drafted by the Carolina Panthers in the sixth round, with the 207th overall pick, of the 2012 NFL Draft. In his rookie season, he finished with 76 punts for 3,267 net yards for a 43.0 average. Nortman set Carolina franchise records for gross punting average and net yards during the 2013 season and was named NFC Special Teams Player of the Month for December 2013. In 2013, Nortman led the NFL in gross yards per punt and air yards per punt in open field punts, averaging 52.6 yards per punt and 51.9 yards per punt, respectively. He finished 3rd in the NFL with 4.6 seconds of hang time per punt. Nortman also set a new record for the Carolina Panthers franchise’s record for average distance per punt in a season. In the 2013 season, he finished with 70 punts for 3,344 net yards. In the 2014 season, he finished with 72 punts for 3,236 net yards for a 44.9 average. In the 2015 season, he finished with 70 punts for 3,175 net yards for a 45.4 average. On February 7, 2016, Nortman was part of the Panthers team that played in Super Bowl 50. In the game, the Panthers fell to the Denver Broncos by a score of 24–10. 
's NFL off-season, Nortman held at least seven Panthers franchise records, including:
 Punts: playoffs (25), playoff game (7 on 2016-02-07 NDEN )
 Punt Yards: game (451 on 2012-11-11 DEN), playoffs (1,012), playoff game (315 on 2016-02-07 NDEN )
 Yards / Punt: season (47.77 in 2013), game (56.71 on 2013-11-24 @MIA)

Jacksonville Jaguars
Nortman signed a four-year, $8.8 million contract with the Jacksonville Jaguars on March 9, 2016.

In Week 4 of the 2016 season, against the Indianapolis Colts, he booted a career-high 78-yard punt. Nortman's 78-yarder tied Johnny Hekker for the longest punt of the 2016 season. Overall, in the 2016 season, Nortman finished with 77 punts for 3,589 net yards for a 46.6 average. In Week 13 of the 2017 season, he completed a 29-yard pass in the game against the Indianapolis Colts. Overall, in the 2017 season, he finished with 87 punts for 3,835 net yards for a 44.1 average.

On April 30, 2018, Nortman was released by the Jaguars after the team drafted punter Logan Cooke in the seventh round of the 2018 NFL draft.

References

External links
 
 Jacksonville Jaguars bio
 Carolina Panthers bio
 

1989 births
Living people
People from Brookfield, Wisconsin
American football punters
Wisconsin Badgers football players
Carolina Panthers players
Jacksonville Jaguars players
Players of American football from Wisconsin
Sportspeople from the Milwaukee metropolitan area